PEN America: A Journal for Writers and Readers is an annual literary journal that features fiction, poetry, conversation, criticism, and memoir. It is published by PEN America in New York City. Contributors include Yousef Al-Mohaimeed, Paul Auster, Michael Cunningham, Lydia Davis, Petina Gappah, Nikki Giovanni, Rawi Hage, Shahriar Mandanipour, Colum McCann, Michael Ondaatje, Marilynne Robinson, Salman Rushdie, Susan Sontag, John Edgar Wideman, and many others.

History 
PEN America was founded in 2000 by M. Mark, then a member of PEN's Board of Trustees. In its first year, PEN America was named one of the "Ten Best New Magazines" by Library Journal. The magazine was nominated for an Utne Independent Press Award for international coverage in 2010. The essay "Ghost Writer," by Cynthia Ozick, published in PEN America 9: Checkpoints, was reprinted in The Best American Essays 2009 (part of The Best American Series). Fiction from the magazine has been selected for the Pushcart Prize in 2009 and 2010.

In February 2009, Edward Albee, André Aciman, Anthony Appiah, Ron Chernow, Lydia Davis, Deborah Eisenberg, Francine Prose, and Sarah Ruhl participated in the journal's first benefit reading.

Issues
 PEN America 1: Classics
 PEN America 2: Home & Away
 PEN America 3: Tribes
 PEN America 4: Fact/Fiction
 PEN America 5: Silences
 PEN America 6: Metamorphoses
 PEN America 7: World Voices
 PEN America 8: Making Histories
 PEN America 9: Checkpoints
 PEN America 10: Fear Itself
 PEN America 11: Make Believe
 PEN America 12: Correspondences
 PEN America 13: Lovers
 PEN America 14: The Good Books
 PEN America 15: Maps
 PEN America 16: Teachers

See also
List of literary magazines

References

External links
 PEN America: A Journal for Writers and Readers website
 PEN America: A Blog for Writers and Readers

Annual magazines published in the United States
Literary magazines published in the United States
Magazines established in 2000
Magazines published in New York City